Sebastian and the Sparrow is a 1988 Australian film directed by Scott Hicks. Hicks says he wanted to make the film one he could watch with his teenage son:
It was a kind of junior buddy movie with the theme of two people who envied each other's life. To Sebastian, Sparrow has the perfect life: nobody's on his back, he can do what he likes. It looks like glorious freedom. But to Sparrow the constraints of that life are very real. There is Sebastian with the luxury of a home, a family and a very well-to-do existence which was Nirvana to him. I love the way those thoughts could jostle together.

Cast
Alexander Bainbridge ... Sebastian Thornbury
Heather Kelly-Laws ... The Captain
Jeremy Angerson ... "Sparrow"
Robert Coleby ... Peter Thornbury
Elizabeth Alexander ... Jenny Thornbury

Many of the outdoor scenes were filmed on location in Port Adelaide, where much of Hicks's acclaimed Shine was filmed.

Reception
Despite some enthusiasm by critics ("An absolute charmer. Should not be missed." - Stan James) the film was not commercially successful, which Hicks blames on poor distribution. It was released on VHS tape by the Home Cinema Group but has not to date made it to DVD.

References

External links
Sebastian and the Sparrow at IMDb
Sebastian and the Sparrow at Oz Movies

Australian adventure drama films
Films directed by Scott Hicks
1980s English-language films
1980s Australian films